Palaeogyrinus may refer to:
Palaeogyrinus Schlechtendal, 1894, a beetle. Now treated as part of Laccophilus
Palaeogyrinus Watson, 1926, an extinct embolomere amphibian. A junior homonym of the above, later renamed Palaeoherpeton